Events during the year 1988 in Northern Ireland.

Incumbents
 Secretary of State - Tom King

Events
11 January - SDLP leader, John Hume and Gerry Adams of Sinn Féin, have a surprise meeting in Belfast.
6 March - Operation Flavius: A Special Air Service team of the British Army shoots dead a Provisional Irish Republican Army (IRA) Active Service Unit (Danny McCann, Seán Savage and Mairéad Farrell, unarmed at the time) in Gibraltar.
16 March - Milltown Cemetery attack: Three men are killed and 70 are wounded in a gun and grenade attack by loyalist paramilitary Michael Stone on mourners at Milltown Cemetery in Belfast during the funerals of the three IRA members killed in Gibraltar.
19 March - Corporals killings in Belfast: British Army corporals Woods and Howes are abducted, beaten and shot dead by Irish republicans after driving into the funeral cortege of IRA members killed in the Milltown Cemetery attack.
15 June - The IRA kills six British soldiers in a bomb attack in Lisburn.
20 August - Ballygawley bus bombing: Eight British soldiers are killed by an IRA bomb attack on their bus in Ballygawley, County Tyrone.
12 October - As Pope John Paul II addresses the European Parliament, Ian Paisley heckles and denounces him as the Antichrist.
19 October - Broadcasting ban against Sinn Féin and other paramilitary linked groups begins.
11 November - Belfast Castle is reopened to the public following major renovation by Belfast City Council.

Arts and literature
3 October - Marie Jones' play Under Napoleon's Nose is premiered on a schools tour.
Glenn Patterson's first novel, Burning Your Own, is published.

Sport

Football
Irish League
Winners: Glentoran

Irish Cup
Winners: Glentoran 1 - 0 Glenavon

FAI Cup
Winners: Dundalk 1 - 0 Derry City

Golf
October 16 - In golf, Ireland (Eamonn Darcy, Ronan Rafferty, Des Smyth) wins the Dunhill Cup at St Andrew's.

Motorcycling
Robert Dunlop wins the 125cc race at the Cookstown 100.

Births
3 January – Jonny Evans, footballer
12 January – Chris Casement, footballer
4 July – Conor MacNeill, actor
23 September – Mark Gallagher, footballer
2 November – Lisa Bowman, netball player

Deaths
2 February - Frederick Blaney, cricketer (born 1918).
6 March - Mairéad Farrell, volunteer of the Provisional Irish Republican Army, killed by SAS soldiers during Operation Flavius (born 1957).
6 March - Daniel McCann, volunteer of the Provisional Irish Republican Army, killed by SAS soldiers during Operation Flavius (born 1957).
6 March - Seán Savage, volunteer of the Provisional Irish Republican Army, killed by SAS soldiers during Operation Flavius (born 1965).
2 November - Stewart Parker, poet and playwright (born 1941).
22 December - Jack Bowden, cricketer and hockey player (born 1916).
24 December – Noel Willman, actor and theatre director (born 1941)

See also
1988 in England
1988 in Scotland
1988 in Wales

References

 
Northern Ireland